Varbovo, Vidin Province is a village in the municipality of Chuprene, in Vidin Province, in northwestern Bulgaria.

References

Villages in Vidin Province